The Battle of Monte Pelado ("Bald Mountain") was an engagement of the Spanish Civil War fought on 28 August 1936. It was notable as the first major engagement of the Italian Republican volunteers of the Matteotti Battalion. 

Monte Pelado, in Aragon, between Huesca and Almudévar, was the site of a Francoist gun emplacement and a concentration of around five hundred Nationalist troops.  In bitter fighting from five until nine in the morning, Italians and the Spanish anarchists of the Francisco Ascaso column seized the Nationalist position while suffering heavy losses.

Amongst those Italian volunteers killed were republican Mario Angeloni, commander of the Column, the anarchist Michele Centrone, the "giellista" Giuseppe Zuddas, the  anarchist Fosco Falaschi, the Communist Attilio Papparotto and the anarchist Vincenzo Perrone. 

Among those Italians who survived were socialist Carlo Rosselli, anarchists Camillo Berneri, Maria Zazzi, and Leonida Mastrodicasa.

See also 

 List of Spanish Republican military equipment of the Spanish Civil War
 List of Spanish Nationalist military equipment of the Spanish Civil War

References

Gli antifascisti grossetani nella guerra civile spagnola in La Risveglia, quadrimestrale di varia umanità. (n°3/4 Gennaio - Aprile 2000, Maggio - Agosto 2000).
La colonna antifascista italiana si batte vittoriosamente davanti a Huesca, in Giustizia e Libertà,( n.36, 4 set. 1936).
Calosso, Umberto. La guerra di Angeloni, in  Il mondo, (1 set. 1951), p. 8
Bifolchi, Giuseppe. Monte Pelato: prima battaglia dell'antifascismo italiano in difesa della rivoluzione in Spagna, in Umanità nova, (27 August 1966).

Monte Pelado
Province of Huesca
Monte Pelado
1936 in Spain
Monte Pelado
August 1936 events